Nicholas Fandos is an American journalist who covers the  Metro desk and the U.S. Congress for The New York Times.

Education 
Fandos attended St. Louis University High School where he was editor-in-chief of the school’s weekly newspaper, the Prep News. He received a B.A. in History and Literature from Harvard University in 2015.

Career 
Fandos began his career as the managing editor of The Harvard Crimson, the university newspaper, and as an intern for Politico. After graduation in 2015, he was named a David Rosenbaum Reporting Intern at The New York Times for three months.

Fandos was offered a full-time position as a news assistant at The Times in 2015 before being promoted to cover Congress and the Trump presidency as a reporter in the Times' Washington D.C. bureau in February 2017. He has made regular appearances on C-SPAN.

Fandos' report on The River of Blood (monument) is among his more notable stories.

Fandos was reportedly criticized by 
Pulitzer Prize winning New York Times reporter Matthew Rosenberg for his overreaction to the January 6,2021 Capitol Hill riots in which Rosenberg is said to have described Fandos and another New York Times reporter as “f---in' b----es” for their dramatic reaction to the riot.

See also 
 New Yorkers in journalism

References

External links 
 
 

Living people
Harvard College alumni
The New York Times people
Politico people
The Harvard Crimson people
Year of birth missing (living people)